Amanda Sofia Margareta Lind (née Johansson; born 2 August 1980) is a politician for the Swedish Green Party. From 2019 to 2021, she was the Minister for Culture and Democracy, with responsibility for sport and national minorities in the cabinet of Prime Minister Stefan Löfven.

Early life and education
From the age of three, Lind grew up in Luleå where her father Erik Hugo Johansson was a pastor and her mother Eva Bask Johansson was a pharmacist. Having studied at Umeå University, she received her master's degree in psychology in 2009.

Career
Lind became a member of Miljöpartiet de gröna, the Swedish Green Party, in 1999 and was a member of the Umeå municipal council from 2002 to 2004.

Lind worked as a child and adolescent psychologist for Västernorrland County council from 2009 to 2011. In 2010, she was appointed spokesperson for the Härnösand social affairs agency and in 2012 as spokesperson for Västernorrland.

Between 2011 and 2014, she chaired the social affairs committee in the municipality of Härnösand with responsibility for cultural, environmental, planning and recreational issues. Lind was municipal councillor and first vice-chair of the municipal council in Härnösand from 2014 to 2018. She became the Green Party secretary in 2016, succeeding Anders Wallner. In January 2019, she became the Swedish Minister for Culture and Democracy, with responsibility also for sport and national minorities. In November 2021, when the Green Party left the government, she was succeeded as minister by Jeanette Gustafsdotter.

Controversy
In 2019, the Chinese ambassador to Sweden Gui Congyou threatened Lind with a ban on entering his country when she attended Svenska PEN’s Tucholsky Prize ceremony in honor of Gui Minhai, a book publisher detained in China.

In 2021, Lind as the Swedish culture minister stated that Elfdalian would remain judged as a dialect by the Swedish government, after an inquiry by Swedish MP Peter Helander as to why the government hadn't investigated whether Elfdalian should be classified as a language, as the Council of Europe had proposed.

Personal life
Lind is married to filmmaker Björn Ola Lind. The couple have three children together. In her spare time she devotes herself to historical re-creation, tennis and handicrafts.

Lind and the Esperanto language
Lind speaks Esperanto and addressed the 104th World Esperanto Congress in fluent Esperanto. The Congress took place in Lahti, Finland from 20 to 27 July 2019. Here is the Esperanto message, with an English translation on the right:

“Saluton, estimataj kongresanoj!

“Mi estas Amanda Lind, sveda ministro pri kulturo, demokratio, sporto kaj naciaj minoritatoj. Kiel ano de Miljöpartiet (la sveda verda partio) kaj la tutmonda verda movado, kaj vivanta naturo kaj floranta kulturo estas valoroj tre proksimaj al mia koro.

“Elkorajn bondezirojn mi sendas al la Universala kongreso. Renkontiĝoj kaj babilado inter homoj estas fundamento por vigla demokrata evoluo. Dankon al vi ĉiuj en la Esperanto-movado pro viaj kontribuoj por instigi komunikadon trans lingvaj kaj naciaj limoj. Ni estu unu homaro sur ĉi-unu terglobo!

“Amike.”

“Hello, esteemed congress delegates!

“I am Amanda Lind, Swedish Minister for Culture, Democracy, Sport and National Minorities. As a member of the Miljöpartiet (the Swedish Green Party) and the global Green movement, both living nature and flowering culture are values very close to my heart.

“I am delighted to send out my cordial good wishes to the World Congress. Meetings and conversations among people are the foundation for vibrant democratic development. Thank you all in the Esperanto movement for your contributions to encourage communication across language and national borders. Let's be one humanity on this one globe!

“In friendship.”

References

External links 

The film of her short talk in Esperanto

Living people
1980 births
Women government ministers of Sweden
Swedish Ministers for Culture
Umeå University alumni
People from Luleå
Swedish Esperantists
21st-century Swedish women politicians
Swedish psychologists
Members of the Riksdag 2022–2026
Members of the Riksdag from the Green Party
Green Party (Sweden) politicians
Women members of the Riksdag